ORA or Ora may refer to:

Arts and entertainment
 Ora (film), a 2011 experimental dance film
 Rita Ora (born 1990), British-Albanian singer-songwriter and actress
 Ora (Jovanotti album), 2011
 Ora (Rita Ora album), 2012
 "Ora", song by James Booker from Gonzo: Live 1976, 2014
 "Ora", song by Lorenzo Jovanotti from Ora, 2011

Business
 ORA (marque), a sub-brand of Chinese automotive manufacturer Great Wall Motors
 Ora TV, an on-demand television company
 One Rail Australia, an Australian train operator

Organizations and political parties
 Ocean Recovery Alliance, an organization for improving oceanic health
 Organization for the Resolution of Agunot, a nonprofit organization
 Reformist Party ORA, a political party in Kosovo
 Authentic Renewal Organization (Organización Renovadora Autentica), a Venezuelan political party
 Revolutionary Anarchist Organization, a French anarchist organization

Places

United States
 Ora, California, an unincorporated community
 Ora Township, Jackson County, Illinois
 Ora, Indiana, an unincorporated community
 Ora, Mississippi, an unincorporated community

Europe
 Ora, Cyprus, a village
 Auer, South Tyrol, Italy (Italian name Ora), a municipality

Asia
 Ora, Gunma, a town in Japan
 Ora District, Gunma, a rural district in Gunma Prefecture, Japan
 Ora, Israel, a settlement southwest of Jerusalem
 Odigram, Pakistan, known in ancient times as Ora

Africa
 Ora River, Uganda

Oceania
 Lake Ora, New Zealand

Other uses
 Ora (currency), used in Orania, Northern Cape
 Ora (beetle), a genus of flea marsh beetles
 Ora (given name), a list of people
 Ora (mythology), in Albanian folklore
 Typhoon Ora (disambiguation), seven tropical cyclones in the Pacific Ocean
 Ora Arena, an entertainment venue in Turkey
 USS Ora (SP-75), an armed U.S. Navy motorboat from 1917 to 1920
 Organisation de resistance de l'armee, a paramilitary group in France during World War II
 Ora, a name for the Italian wine grape Garganega
 Ora, a dialect name for the Ivbiosakon language of Nigeria
 Ora, a native name for the Komodo dragon
 Ora, mother of Serug in the Bible
 .ora, the default extension for OpenRaster files
 ISO 639-3 code for the Oroha language, spoken in the Solomon Islands
 ora is "hour" in Italian.

See also
 Ora serrata, serrated junction between the retina and the ciliary body
 Oras (disambiguation)
 Orra (disambiguation)